Federal Highway 195 (Carretera Federal 195) is a Federal Highway of Mexico. The highway travels from Villahermosa, Tabasco in the north to El Escopetazo, Chiapa de Corzo Municipality, Chiapas in the south.

References

195